The Estadio Nacional disaster took place on 24 May 1964 at the Estadio Nacional in Lima, Peru, during a match between Peru and Argentina. An unpopular decision by the referee outraged the Peruvian fans, who invaded the pitch. Police retaliated by firing tear gas into the crowd, causing a mass exodus. The deaths mainly occurred from people suffering from internal hemorrhaging or asphyxiation from the crushing against the steel shutters that led down to the street. The incident is considered the worst disaster in the history of association football.

Background 
On 24 May 1964, Peru hosted Argentina at the Estadio Nacional in Lima. The game, in the qualifying round for the Tokyo Olympics' football tournament, was seen as vital for Peru, then holding the second qualifying place in the CONMEBOL table, who would face a tough match against Brazil in their final game. The match attracted a crowd of 53,000 to the stadium.

Events 
With Argentina leading 1–0 and six minutes of normal time remaining, a would-be equalising goal by Peru was disallowed by Uruguayan referee Ángel Eduardo Pazos. This decision infuriated the home fans and triggered a pitch invasion. Peruvian police fired tear gas canisters into the northern grandstand to prevent further fans from invading the field of play. This caused panic and an attempt at a mass exodus to avoid the gas.

Rather than standard gates, the stadium had solid corrugated steel shutters at the bottom of tunnels that connected the street level, via several flights of steps, to the seating areas above. These shutters were closed as they normally were at every game. Panicked spectators moving down the enclosed stairways pressed those in the lead against the closed shutters, but this was not visible to the crowd pushing down the stairwells from behind. The shutters finally burst outward as a result of pressure from the crush of bodies inside. All of those that died were killed in the stairwells down to the street level, most from internal haemorrhaging or asphyxia. No one who stayed inside the stadium died. In the street, the crowd caused destruction to private property around the stadium.

Aftermath 
The official death toll is 328, but this may be an underestimate since deaths by gunshot were not counted in the official estimates. Even this total is higher than those killed in the Hillsborough disaster, the Bradford fire, the Heysel disaster, the 1971 Ibrox disaster, the 1902 Ibrox disaster, and the Burnden Park disaster combined. Following the incident, a decision was made to reduce the seating capacity of the stadium from 53,000 to 42,000 in 1964, although this was later increased to 47,000 for the 2004 Copa América.

References

External links
Lima 1964: The world's worst stadium disaster (BBC)

Football qualification for the 1964 Summer Olympics
Association football controversies
Association football riots
Stadium disasters
Olympic deaths
1964 in Peruvian football
May 1964 events in South America
Peru national football team